Norton is a surname with origin from the basic Early English norþ + tun, meaning North settlement (cf Weston, Sutton and Easton for other surnames derived from points of the compass). There are many English villages called Norton or including Norton as part of the name, e.g. Midsomer Norton, Chipping Norton, Brize Norton etc. When surnames started to be used in the Middle Ages, a man from such a village might have the name added e.g. Tom of Norton. Alternatively a man from the north side of any village might be given the name Tom Norton to distinguish him from a Tom from the south side (Tom Sutton). A secondary source for the surname is from the anglicisation of Celtic (Irish and Scottish Gaelic) surnames (e.g. Naughtan). It is also sometimes found as a Jewish surname (probably from the anglicisation of the German surname Norden). The famous Emperor Norton in San Francisco was of Jewish origin from a South African settler family.

Distribution
As a surname, Norton is the 660th most common surname in Great Britain, with 14,856 bearers. It is most common in Lancashire, where it is the 389th most common surname, with 1,837 bearers. Other concentrations include North Lanarkshire, (28th, 1,773), Hereford and Worcester, (50th, 1,733), Gloucestershire, (145th, 1,827), Devon (159th, 1,791), West Yorkshire, (235th, 1,755), Cheshire, (235th, 1,731), and Essex, (377th, 1,719).

In Ireland, the surname could be of both Irish and English origin. The Nortons of Athlone are descended from Feradach Ó Neachtain who died in 1790.

People

Fictional characters
 Ed and Trixie Norton, in the TV series The Honeymooners
 Warden Samuel Norton, in the 1982 novella Rita Hayworth and Shawshank Redemption and 1994 film The Shawshank Redemption
 Susan Norton, in the 1975 novel 'Salem's Lot 
 Mr. Norton, in the 1952 novel Invisible Man
 Dr. Dennett Norton, in the 2014 film RoboCop
 Norton Campbell, a playable survivor in the Chinese horror game Identity V.

References

See also
 Justice Norton (disambiguation)

English-language surnames
English toponymic surnames